The Thing Which Solomon Overlooked 2 is the eleventh album by Japanese experimental band Boris. This is the second installment of the Thing Which Solomon Overlooked series and was released concurrently with the following installment, The Thing Which Solomon Overlooked 3.

Like other albums in this series, The Thing Which Solomon Overlooked 2 is centered on drone music and retains some of the characteristics from the first installment (lack of vocals and drumming), except for the track "No Ones Grieve Part 2" which is the first in the series to feature drums; this track also appears with vocals on the 2008 album Smile. Compared to most of the band's discography, this series of albums contains primarily improvised music.

The album was pressed on vinyl and only 1000 copies were made. 700 copies pressed in orange vinyl were distributed by the label Conspiracy Records who was in charge of the release while the remaining 300 copies pressed in green vinyl were sold exclusively on tour. The cover is nearly identical to the first album of the series, The Thing Which Solomon Overlooked except for the change of font to green (instead of orange), the addition of the "2" to the title, and the position of the curtain on the right side which was modified slightly.

This album, along with all the other albums in the series, was remastered for the 2013 boxset The Thing Which Solomon Overlooked - Chronicle.

Track listing

Personnel

 Atsuo - Musician
 Takeshi - Musician
 Wata - Musician
 Mastered by Souichirou Nakamura
 Produced by Boris
 Recorded, Mixed, and Artwork by Fangs Anal Satan

Pressing history

References

External links
 

2006 albums
Boris (band) albums